Hanna Karasiova (Belarusian: Ганна Карасіява) is a Belarusian rider who competes in dressage. She competed at the 2017 FEI European Championships in Goteborg, Sweden, and at the World Cup Finals in Omaha 2017 and Paris 2018. She has qualified for the Tokyo 2020 Olympics as an individual.

References 

Living people
1984 births
Belarusian female equestrians
Belarusian dressage riders
Olympic equestrians of Belarus
Sportspeople from Minsk